The 2019–20 Hazfi Cup was the 33rd season of the Iranian football knockout competition.

Participating teams
A total of 96 teams are eligible participate in the 2019–20 Hazfi Cup. The teams were divided into four main groups.

16 teams of the Persian Gulf Pro League: (entering from Round of 32)

18 teams of Azadegan League:  (entering from Third Round)

28 teams of 2nd Division:  (entering from Second Round)

34 teams of Provincial Leagues: (Kish and Khoramshahr can have extra Representatives.) (entering from First Round)

Schedule
The schedule of the competition is as follows.

First stage

First round

Source:

Second round

Mes Novin Kerman, Shohadaye Razakan Karaj, Kheibar Khoram Abad : Bye to the next round

Third round

Mes Kerman, Gol Reyhan Alborz, Khooshe Talaei Saveh, Nirooye Zamini, Baadraan Tehran : Bye to the next round

Second stage

Fourth round (round of 32) 
The 16 teams from Iran Pro League entered the competition from the second stage.

Fifth round (round of 16)

Sixth round (quarter-final)

Seventh round (semifinal)

Eighth round (final)

Bracket

Statistics

Top Scorers 
Goalscorers count only from the second stage.

Players in bold are still in the competition.

Discipline
A player is automatically suspended for the next match for the following offences:
 Receiving a red card (red card suspensions may be extended for serious offences)
 Receiving two yellow cards in two different matches (yellow card suspensions are not carried forward to any other leagues)
The following suspensions were served during the tournament:

See also 
 Iran Pro League 2019–20
 Azadegan League 2019–20
 Iran Football's 2nd Division 2019–20
 Iran Football's 3rd Division 2019–20
 Iranian Super Cup

Notes

References

External links
 Miza online

Hazfi Cup seasons
Hazfi Cup
Hazfi Cup
Hafzi Cup, 2019-20